George Dunn (November 23, 1914 – April 27, 1982) was an American actor, humorist, vaudeville performer, and satirist. He often portrayed Western characters in film and television. His homespun wit, rope tricks, and satirizing of American life, politics, and sports reflected the strong influence Will Rogers had on him as an entertainer.

Career

Born Ollen George Dunn in Brownwood, Texas, Dunn made his way to New York City to perform in vaudeville. From there, he went on to Hollywood, where he appeared in twenty five motion pictures and more than one hundred television shows. Some of his appearances were uncredited bit parts.

One of his major roles was "The Prophet" in Operation Petticoat, alongside Tony Curtis and Gavin MacLeod. Dunn also appeared in several other well-known films, including Giant, Inherit the Wind, The Long, Hot Summer, The Kettles on Old MacDonald's Farm, and Shenandoah. In another phase of his career, he appeared in a number of John Cassavetes films, including Faces and A Woman Under the Influence. Like John Wayne's, Dunn's final role was in The Shootist. In addition to his film work, Dunn appeared in many popular television shows throughout the mid '50s, '60s, and '70s, such as The Andy Griffith Show, Bonanza, The Beverly Hillbillies, My Favorite Martian, and Starsky and Hutch. He also appeared in the Off-Broadway production of The Rainmaker in 1954.

While George Dunn never attained celebrity status, his long and steady acting career allowed him to travel around the world three times, visiting 95 countries. His world travels provided him with much fodder for humorous storytelling and entertaining after-dinner speaking engagements.

Death
Dunn died on April 27, 1982, in Los Angeles, California, aged 67, from undisclosed causes.

Filmography

References
 George Dunn Filmography

External links
 
 

1914 births
1982 deaths
Male actors from Texas
American male film actors
American humorists
American male stage actors
American male television actors
People from Brownwood, Texas
Vaudeville performers
Male Western (genre) film actors
20th-century American male actors